Emma Marfard Grant (born 30 September 1991) is a British racing cyclist, who currently rides for UCI Women's Continental Team .

See also
 List of 2016 UCI Women's Teams and riders

References

External links
 

1991 births
Living people
British female cyclists
Sportspeople from Oxford
21st-century British women